Thomas Wynchestere (fl. 1397) was an English politician.

He was a Member (MP) of the Parliament of England for Wells in January 1397. No more is known of him.

References

14th-century births
Year of death missing
English MPs January 1397